Megalurothrips is a genus of thrips belonging to the family Thripidae.

The species of this genus are found in Old World and Australia.

Species:

Megalurothrips basisetae 
Megalurothrips distalis 
Megalurothrips equaletae 
Megalurothrips flaviflagellus 
Megalurothrips formosae 
Megalurothrips guizhouensis 
Megalurothrips haopingensis 
Megalurothrips longus 
Megalurothrips mucunae 
Megalurothrips peculiaris 
Megalurothrips sinensis 
Megalurothrips sjoestedti 
Megalurothrips sjostedti 
Megalurothrips typicus 
Megalurothrips usitatus

References

Thripidae